Maheen Khan is a well-known pioneer in the design industry of Bangladesh for creating the market for garments featuring local traditional designs. She is the managing director and founder of Mayasir. She is also the founding chair of Fashion Design Council of Bangladesh.

Early life and education
Maheen Khan was born in a family traditionally linked with clothing designing. Her father was one of the select few to embrace textiles as a career back in the 1950s and her mother has worked extensively for local weavers in Bangladesh. Khan completed her Bachelor of Fine Arts (BFA) in textiles from Otis College of Art and Design. She completed her graduation in Textile from Parsons School of Design in California, USA.

Work
Maheen Khan started her career as chief design coordinator in Arong in 1986. She left Arong in 2001 and established her own fashion house Mayasir Limited. Local fabrics such as khadi, cotton, silk and muslin are used in Mayasir's products. Now Mayasir has its own garment factory. Mayasir took part Asia's most anticipated bridal couture extravaganza Bridal Asia in New Delhi India in 2008. As a  founding chair of Arts Council Dhaka, which advocates and promotes long-neglected Bengal art. While on fellowship, she met with fashion designers; examined heritage textiles; studied folk arts promotion and related social enterprises; and visited museums and galleries featuring Central and South Asian Collections and Native American Arts.
Maheen also writes a regular column on design and heritage crafts for the Amader Kotha, a women-based portal. She writes a regular column on design and heritage crafts for The Daily Star. She is serving as President of Fashion Design Council of Bangladesh (FDCB)

Achievements
 Bridal Asia Show in New Delhi India in 2008
Eisenhower Fellowship 2012

References

Further reading
 
 
 
 
 

Living people
Bangladeshi businesspeople
Year of birth missing (living people)
Bangladeshi fashion designers
Bangladeshi women fashion designers